The Fab Four is a California-based tribute band paying homage to The Beatles. Founded in 1997 by Ron McNeil, a John Lennon impersonator, the group began performing Beatles music throughout southern California. They have played in many places worldwide, including Japan, Malaysia, France, Hong Kong, the United Kingdom, Germany, Australia, Mexico and Brazil, covering nearly the entire Beatles songbook and material from Beatles members' solo projects.

The band's beginnings included Tuesday night performances at a small venue called Music City in Fountain Valley, as well as regular performances at Disneyland's Tomorrowland Terrace in Anaheim, The Hop in Puente Hills and Scruffy O’Sheas in Marina del Rey. The core group consisted of McNeil (John Lennon), along with Ardy Sarraf (Paul McCartney), Michael Amador (George Harrison) and Rolo Sandoval (Ringo Starr). From 2005 to 2008, The Fab Four brought in a second cast of musicians to help perform a full stage show six nights a week in Las Vegas, with various members alternating between cast. Performing as Fab Four Mania, the Vegas cast performed regularly at locations such as the Las Vegas Hilton, The Aladdin, The Sahara and The Riviera.

In 2013, the Fab Four received an Emmy Award for their PBS special "The Fab Four: The Ultimate Tribute," filmed at Pechanga Resort & Casino in 2012. As of 2019, the most common lineup formerly consisted of Ardy Sarraf (McCartney), Adam Hastings (Lennon), Gavin Pring (Harrison) and Joe Bologna (Starr).

As of 2020 & 2022, due to the COVID-19 pandemic, The Fab Four have been live streaming numerous concerts, with Ron McNeil, Rolo Sandoval and Erik Fidel coming back.

The cast

John Lennon
Ron McNeil 
Adam Hastings 
Jon Fickes (stand-in)
Robbie Berg (stand-in)

Sir Paul McCartney
Ardavan "Ardy" Sarraf
Neil Candelora (stand-in)
Joshua Jones (stand-in)

George Harrison
Gavin Pring
Robbie Berg (stand-in)
Doug Couture (stand-in)

Sir Richard Starkey (Ringo Starr) 
Erik Fidel
Richard Lewis (stand in)

Ed Sullivan
George Trullinger
Jeff DeHart (stand-in)

Side projects

Wingsband 
Formed by Ardy Sarraf, Wingsband is a Paul McCartney and Wings tribute act that covers many of McCartney's biggest post-Beatles hits. The band features Ron McNeil as Denny Laine, Michael Amador as Henry McCullough and Rolo Sandoval as Joe English, plus a horns section led by Wendell Kelly (The Temptations, Stevie Wonder, Lionel Richie, Whitney Houston) and singer/songwriter Christine Rosander as Linda McCartney. Both Laurence Juber, Wings guitarist from 1978 to 1981, and Denny Seiwell, the original Wings drummer from 1971 to 1973, have performed onstage with Wingsband at The Grove in Anaheim, CA.

George Harry’s Son 
George Harrison impersonator and Liverpool native, Gavin Pring, created a tribute act called George Harry's Son to celebrate Harrison's solo material, as well as his hits from the Beatle years. Pring has brought this act to the top Beatles music festivals, including the annual Beatleweek in Liverpool at the Mathew Street Festival and Abbey Road on the River in the United States. Pring also performed on the same stage as Paul McCartney in 2002 for the tribute show held on Harrison's birthday.

Rutlemania 
In 2007, The Fab Four was approached by Eric Idle from the British comedy group Monty Python to perform a set of shows celebrating the 30th anniversary of The Rutles, a Beatles parody group formed in 1975 by Idle and Neil Innes. The show featured McNeil as Ron Nasty (originally played by Innes), Sarraf as Dirk McQuickly (Idle), Amador as Stig O’Hara (Ricky Fataar) and Sandoval as Barry Wom (John Halsey), and was performed multiple nights in both Los Angeles and New York.

Yellow Submarine movie remake 
In 2010, The Fab Four was cast to do the motion-capture performance footage for director Robert Zemeckis' 3-D remake of The Beatles animated film classic, Yellow Submarine. The movie was set to be released sometime in 2012, but Disney canceled the project when Zemeckis' film Mars Needs Moms performed poorly in the box office and critics' reviews of Zemeckis' animations were mostly negative.

Notable appearances 
Recorded Beatles tracks "I Want to Hold Your Hand", "Please Please Me" and "Kansas City" that were featured in the biopic The Linda McCartney Story in 2000.
Performed at the Hollywood Bowl in 2003 for the 37th anniversary of the Beatles’ concerts there.
Performed at the official DVD release party for the Miramax edition of A Hard Day’s Night at the Los Angeles House of Blues in 2004.
Featured as a headlining act during Liverpool’s annual Beatleweek in 2004, 2008 and 2011.
Held nightly shows at many venues in Las Vegas from 2005 to 2008, including the Las Vegas Hilton, The Aladdin, The Sahara and The Riviera.
Featured on many TV shows and channels, including Entertainment Tonight, Good Morning America, Hallmark Channel and Ellen DeGeneres’ Really Big Show in 2007.
Had their version of "The Little Drummer Boy" played on the show House M.D. in the 2008 episode "It's A Wonderful Lie."
Performed the motion capture for the Harmonix video game The Beatles: Rock Band in 2009.
Featured in their own PBS special, filmed at Pechanga Resort & Casino in January 2012.
Performed at an unveiling of Madame Tussaud's Beatles wax figures, when the figures were brought to Las Vegas from London for a short exhibit in 2012.
Performed the Sgt. Pepper's Lonely Heart's Club Band album in its entirety on The World's Greatest Tribute Bands on AXS TV, recorded live at the Whisky a Go Go in West Hollywood in May 2017.
Featured as guests and performers several times on the weekly radio show Breakfast with the Beatles, hosted by Chris Carter. 
Have played at the Le Palais Des Sports in Paris, where the Beatles once performed.
Performed for many celebrities, including Eric Idle, Paul Stanley from KISS, Mark Hudson (Ringo Starr producer) and Tom Hanks.
Performed alongside Micky Dolenz, (The Monkees) and Mark Lindsay (Paul Revere & the Raiders).
Named the official Beatles tribute band of radio station K-earth 101.

Discography 
Adam Hastings  – Vocals, Guitar, Keyboards, Harmonica
Ardy Sarraf – Vocals, Bass, Keyboards, Guitar
Gavin Pring – Vocals, Lead Guitar, Keyboards, Sitar
Joseph Bologna – Vocals, Drums, Percussion

All songs were arranged, performed, recorded and produced by The Fab Four.

A Fab Four Christmas 
Release Date - October 16, 2002
Label - Delta Ent. (LaserLight)

Have Yourself a FAB-ulous Little Christmas 
Release Date - October 16, 2002 
Label - Delta Ent. (LaserLight)

HARK! 
Release Date - 2008 
Label - Robo Records

In 2008, all songs from both albums were digitally remastered and released on a single album entitled HARK!, available on Amazon, iTunes and The Fab Four's official website. The compilation includes the bonus tracks "Sleigh Ride" and "The First Noel", in the style of "Lady Madonna" and "Let It Be", respectively.

The Ultimate Beatles Tribute in Concert, Vol. 1
Release Date - 2002/2011 
Label - Self-released

Recorded live at the Tomorrowland Terrace at Disneyland in the summer of 2001.

TV Special Soundtrack
Release Date - 2013 
Label - Self-released

The soundtrack to the PBS special The Fab Four: The Ultimate Tribute, recorded live at Pechanga Resort & Casino in January 2012. Available exclusively on CD at the Fab Four's official website.

Personnel
Ron McNeil – Vocals, Guitar, Keyboards, Harmonica
Ardy Sarraf – Vocals, Bass, Keyboards, Guitar
Gavin Pring – Vocals, Lead Guitar, Keyboards, Sitar
Erik Fidel – Vocals, Drums, Percussion

References

The Beatles tribute bands
Musical groups established in 1997